Grupo Desportivo Interclube da Huíla or simply Inter da Huíla, is an Angolan sports club from the city of Lubango.

Just like its counterpart from Luanda, the club is attached to the Angolan police force.

In 2004, the Angolan Ministry of the Interior ruled that Inter de Luanda was the only club authorized to participate in the Girabola. Subsequently, the club withdrew from senior competition and focused on their youth academy.

League & Cup Positions

Manager history and performance

Players

1982

References

Football clubs in Angola
Sports clubs in Angola